The Capital Machinery Factory Capital-1 was a twin-engined monoplane light transport/utility aircraft designed and built in the People's Republic of China at Beijing in the late 1950s.

Design and development
The late 1950s saw a great leap in capability for the Chinese aviation industry with a wealth of indigenously designed aircraft projects, one of which was the Capital-1. The Capital-1 bore a close resemblance to the contemporary Antonov An-14 Ptchelka, being twin-engined, twin-tailed with strut supported monoplane wings and fixed tricycle undercarriage, stub lower wing bracing the undercarriage and wing strutsand a podlike fuselage terminating in a boom carrying the tail-unit.

Powered by two  M-11FR engines in helmeted cowlings, the Capital-1 had a mediocre performance with relatively short range and limited payload. Production of the aircraft was not continued past the prototype stage.

Specifications (Capital-1)

See also

Notes

References

1950s Chinese civil utility aircraft
High-wing aircraft
Aircraft first flown in 1958
Twin piston-engined tractor aircraft